Pseudobazisa is a genus of moths in the subfamily Lymantriinae. The genus was erected by Felix Bryk in 1934.

Species
Pseudobazisa desperata (Hering, 1929) Congo
Pseudobazisa kapanga Collenette, 1939 Congo
Pseudobazisa perculta (Distant, 1897) southern Africa
Pseudobazisa thermochrous (Hering, 1929) Congo

References

Lymantriinae